Line 4 Sheppard is the newest and shortest subway line of the Toronto subway system, operated by the Toronto Transit Commission (TTC). It opened on November 22, 2002, and has five stations along  of track, which is built without any open sections in the district of North York along Sheppard Avenue East between Yonge Street and Don Mills Road. All stations are wheelchair accessible and are decorated with unique public art. The Government of Ontario has announced plans to extend the line east to Sheppard Avenue and McCowan Road in Scarborough to meet up with an extended Line 2 Bloor–Danforth.

Name
When the line opened in 2002, it was officially given the name "Sheppard Subway". In October 2013, the TTC announced plans to give the lines official numbers to help riders and visitors navigate the system. The Sheppard line was renamed "Line 4 Sheppard" and new signage reflecting this began being gradually implemented in March 2014. The Toronto Rocket trains also use the numerical system for interchange station announcements, such as announcing "Change for Line 1" when the trains arrive at Sheppard–Yonge station.

History

Origins
The TTC proposed the Sheppard line as part of the Network 2011 transportation plan, unveiled in 1985, which called for a line from Yonge Street to Victoria Park Avenue on the boundary between North York and Scarborough. The plan was approved by Metropolitan Toronto, but funding was delayed by the provincial government of David Peterson's Liberal Party.

In 1993, the governing New Democratic Party (NDP) under Bob Rae proposed provincial funding for four subway/LRT projects for the TTC. Included in these four proposals were plans to build new subway lines along Eglinton and Sheppard Avenues and work was begun on both projects. The NDP was defeated in the 1995 provincial election and the Progressive Conservatives under Mike Harris were elected. Harris cancelled the Eglinton subway in York (though it would be later revived as Line 5 Eglinton, albeit as a light rail line) but continued work on the Sheppard line.

Funding for the Sheppard line was initially rejected by city council. However, after a number of votes on different alterations to the project (including only building the subway line as far as Leslie Street), the proposal to build the Sheppard line tunnels only, without tracks, was passed by a narrow margin. After this vote passed city council, a re-vote was taken on the entire Sheppard line project to Don Mills, which then passed by a very narrow margin. James Bow, a Toronto transit reporter, documented that the political clout of North York mayor Mel Lastman (he was later elected mayor of the amalgamated City of Toronto in 1998) was crucial to the Sheppard line proposal being implemented. Councillor Joe Pantalone strongly supported the line, arguing it was a matter of civic equity and that the suburbs deserved good transit, which wouldin his opinionbring Transit-oriented development. David L. Gunn, who was general manager of the TTC, opposed the Sheppard line, saying that it "made no sense to build an expensive new subway when the existing system was strapped for cash to make basic repairs" and "if the city wanted to expand transit, it would be better to do it downtown, easing congestion in the busiest parts of the system".

Completion and opening

The Sheppard line was opened on November 22, 2002. It was the city's first new subway line since the opening of the Bloor–Danforth line in 1966. It remained the newest subway infrastructure in Toronto for 15 years until the opening of the Toronto–York Spadina Subway Extension in 2017. It is shorter than had been planned, running from Yonge Street (at the former Sheppard station, renamed Sheppard–Yonge when the Sheppard line opened) east to Don Mills Road rather than further west to Downsview station (renamed Sheppard West in May 2017) and southeast to Scarborough Centre station. Downsview had been built in 1996, ostensibly with the intention of being the western terminus of the Sheppard line prior to the latter's truncation.

The Sheppard line cost just under C$1billion and took eight years to build. It is the first subway line in Canada that had plain tunnel sections built entirely by tunnel boring machine. The Sheppard line is the only subway line in Toronto that does not have any open sections. All stations on the line were constructed using the cut-and-cover method, with the expansion of Sheppard station having required an S-shaped diversion of Yonge Street during construction. Just east of Leslie station, there is an enclosed concrete bridge over the east branch of the Don River.

It was the first line to have accessible elevators at every station. The automated system to announce each station was installed in January 2006.

Its stations were built to accommodate the TTC's standard subway trains of six  cars, but part of each platform was blocked off since only four-car trains are needed to carry the amount of traffic on the line. The line was designed so that it can be extended at both ends, allowing for the construction of westward and eastward branches that had been planned. Likewise, the Sheppard line level of Sheppard–Yonge station was constructed with a roughed-in Spanish solution platform layout in anticipation of increased ridership.

Platform screen doors were proposed for the Sheppard line. Installed at the edge of the platforms, platform screen doors would have aligned themselves with the subway-car doors when trains were in station for safety and suicide prevention. The proposed system was dropped because of its cost.

Rolling stock
From its opening in November 2002 to May 2016, the line was operated solely with four-car T1 subway trains, with two staff members operating the trains – one driver and one guard who operated the doors. On May 30, 2016, new four-car Toronto Rocket (TR) subway trains were introduced on this line. They replaced the older T1 subway trains, which were moved to Line 2 Bloor–Danforth. The TRs are based on Bombardier Transportation's Movia-styled train sets and are the first TTC trains which have no separators between the cars. This allows passengers to walk freely from one end to the other, unlike Toronto's previous subway cars. The change to TR trains was necessary because Line 4 trains are based in Davisville Yard, which is accessed via Line 1 Yonge–University. Line 1 was converted to operate using an automatic train control system, with the conversion finishing in September 2022.  From October 9, 2016, Line 4 has been serviced entirely by four-car TR trains, which are operated by one staff member who both drives the train and operates the doors, similar to the model already in place on Line 3 Scarborough.

Residential development

From its opening in 2002 to 2014, the Sheppard line spurred over $1billion of construction of new housing, including several high-rise condominium towers, along its route as transit-oriented developments. Since 2000, condominium towers have been built around all five stations on the line, with most of the new developments being centred around Bayview and Bessarion stations. The Daniels Corporation built a six-tower development, called NY Towers, north of Highway 401 between Bayview and Bessarion stations; Arc Condominiums on the northeast corner of Bayview Avenue and Sheppard Avenue; and terraced condos just east of their NY Towers. Shane Baghai built a multi-tower development in the area.

In 2007, Leslie and Bessarion stations were the least-used stations in the system; in 2015, four of twenty planned buildings of Concord Adex Investments' new condominium complex, Concord Park Place, located between these two stations, had been completed. The complex is being developed on the site of a former Canadian Tire warehouse/distribution centre, though Canadian Tire retains a retail location there. There is also development around Swedish furniture chain IKEA in the immediate area.

Ridership

From late 2002 to 2011, ridership on the Sheppard subway rose from about 10.7million riders annually to a peak of 15.9million. The following table shows the typical number of customer trips made on the Sheppard subway on an average weekday.

Note: 2017 figures, as well as figures for 2019 and later, are unavailable.

Station art

Line 4 features artwork in each station, such as the scenic mosaic mural at Sheppard–Yonge station, Bayview station's trompe-l'œil and Leslie station's individual wall tiles, each containing the words "Sheppard & Leslie".

Criticism

The line has been criticized as a "subway to nowhere", a "stubway", or a "white elephant". In 2018, the total ridership on the Sheppard subway line was approximately 50,000 per average weekday, similar to a few of the TTC's busiest streetcar and bus routes, though these routes are generally much longer than Sheppard's  length. The Sheppard line feeds passengers into the Yonge segment of Line 1 Yonge–University. During the City of Toronto's 2008 budget crisis, the TTC considered shutting the line down on weekends or entirely.

Jarrett Walker, a transportation consultant and the author of the book Human Transit, says "Sheppard's technology makes it both expensive to abandon and expensive to extend; that's the trap."

Councillor Josh Colle, who chaired the TTC from 2014 to 2018, said in May 2015 that, given the existing Sheppard subway's performance, he could rationalize spending more money to expand it east from Don Mills or west from Sheppard–Yonge. He estimated that the Sheppard subway receives a subsidy of more than $10 per ride.

According to the Metro commuter newspaper, between the opening of the Sheppard line in November 2002 and December 2014, there was over $1billion in development along that corridor, much of it in the vicinity of Bayview, Bessarion and Don Mills stations. Despite this, a majority of commuters along the Sheppard subway drive to work rather than using public transit. In 2016, according to Royson James of the Toronto Star, residents in the area commuted to jobs throughout the Greater Toronto Area by automobile rather than taking public transit. James stated that subways are designed for corridors with four to eight times the ridership along Sheppard Avenue East.

Future expansion
Several informal proposals have been made to extend the line in both directions. The original proposal for the Sheppard line was for a major subway line running from Sheppard West station on the University portion of Line 1 to Scarborough Centre station. Instead, funding was only approved for a truncated line with the possibility of several phased expansions.

, neither the eastward nor westward extension projects are active. However, the eastward extension has provincial government support but has neither funding nor a target date for completion.

Eastward extension
The TTC considered the eastward extension of the Sheppard line to Scarborough Centre station as one of its top priorities for rapid-transit expansion, which would have expanded rapid transit in Scarborough for the first time since the completion of Line 3 Scarborough. In 2015, the TTC estimated that a Sheppard subway to Scarborough Centre would have 7,800 riders per hour while 10,000 per hour was the minimum number of riders per hour considered appropriate for a subway. The maximum capacity of the subway is about 30,000 riders per hour, approximately the load the Yonge portion of Line 1 carries in the morning rush.

In April 2019, the provincial government under Premier Doug Ford announced that it supported an eastward extension of Line 4, but there was not yet a promise of funding nor a proposed target date for completion. The province revised the proposed route to terminate and meet a proposed Scarborough Subway Extension of Line 2 Bloor–Danforth at Sheppard Avenue East and McCowan Road instead of at Scarborough Centre.

Westward extension

A separate  westward extension was proposed to Sheppard West station on Line 1. Lower population density made this expansion a much lower priority than the eastward one, as the minimal increase in ridership was insufficient to justify the costs. The approval of the Spadina subway extension to the Vaughan Metropolitan Centre in York Region renewed interest in this phase, as a subway connection between Sheppard West and Sheppard–Yonge stations would significantly lower commuting times for York University students. The tunnel from Sheppard–Yonge to Welbeck Road (east of Senlac Road) was built for train storage at the time of original construction. In December 2009, a westward extension was again considered by the TTC to link the line to Wilson Subway Yard. It was immediately dismissed due to cost. In December 2013, this extension was listed as being under consideration as an "unfunded future rapid transit project" in the City of Toronto's "Feeling Congested?" report. , the westward extension had neither provincial government support nor funding.

At its February 20, 2020, meeting, the Metrolinx board of directors endorsed a prioritization framework for a proposed frequent rapid transit network that was inclusive of a proposed subway extension from Sheppard–Yonge station to Sheppard West station; with a forecast ridership of 9,800 per hour in 2031 and a proposed line length of  along Sheppard Avenue West, the project scored "medium" with a preliminary benefit-cost ratio of 0.26 to 0.35.

Political debates and proposals
Since 2007, there have been a series of political debates and proposals about whether to extend Line 4 east or west, or whether Line 4 should be continued eastwards as a separate light-rail line or as a heavy-rail extension of Line 4. Major political decisions were made only to be later reversed. The following sections detail the major proposals.

Transit City

In March 2007, the City of Toronto, under the mayoralty of David Miller, and the TTC released the Transit City proposal to begin a new round of transit expansion using light rail technology on dedicated rights-of-way instead of subway technology. Under this plan, the Sheppard East subway extension had been replaced by a light rail line running from Don Mills Station along Sheppard Avenue East to Meadowvale Road, where it would have met the northern terminus of an extended Line 3 Scarborough. Under this proposal, there would be no direct connection between North York City Centre and Scarborough City Centre.

Rob Ford era
As a result of the election of Rob Ford as mayor of Toronto in 2010, the western extension of the Sheppard subway to Sheppard West Station and the eastern extension to Scarborough Centre were considered a priority again. He indicated in a December 2010 interview with The Globe and Mail that all other transit projects would come second to completing the Sheppard line, stating "I'm just focusing on doing the Sheppard subway underground."

On March 31, 2011, Rob Ford announced that the proposed Sheppard East LRT line would be replaced by western and eastern extensions for the Sheppard line so that the completed line would run from Sheppard West station to Scarborough Centre. The Ontario government approved this plan, which was estimated to cost $4.2billion. The City of Toronto would assume complete financial responsibility for the project, which was proposed to be funded through a public–private partnership, as well as through the use of surplus funds from the proposed Eglinton Crosstown line (later renamed Line 5 Eglinton), if there were any. Massive redevelopment along the route would be needed to generate these funds, as the then-current population density and projected ridership was too low to support the cost of the expansion by itself.

Gordon Chong, head of the TTC agency tasked with analyzing the new subway plans at the time, said it was possible that no new transit development would occur along Sheppard Avenue.

Stintz's alternative
On January 23, 2012, TTC chair Karen Stintz suggested a plan to extend the line two stops eastwards funded by making the eastern portion of Line 5 Eglinton at street level. This motion was defeated by the TTC board. She then got 24 councillors (a majority) to sign a petition calling for a special council meeting for February 8 of that year.

In the meeting, council voted to build the Eglinton project according to the original Transit City plan (partly underground and partly at grade), build an at-grade Finch LRT, and to appoint a panel to recommend whether to pursue the eastward extension of the Sheppard subway or construct the Sheppard East LRT instead. The panel reported back to council on March 31, 2012. At this council meeting, council approved light rail rather than a subway extension for Sheppard. On April 26 of that year, the motion to build the LRT was announced by the Minister of Transportation after being approved unanimously by Metrolinx. The plan still needed to be approved by Ontario's cabinet, though on June 29, 2012, the Board of Directors of Metrolinx unanimously approved the same motion approved by Metrolinx in April.

Early Tory era
During the 2014 Toronto mayoral election, incumbent mayor Rob Ford (and his brother Doug Ford, after the prior's withdrawal) were the only major candidates who supported completing the Sheppard line east to McCowan Road (phase-one project) and west to Sheppard West station (phase-two project). John Tory, who won the election, did not include anything on the Sheppard corridor in his maps; instead, he favoured SmartTrack, a proposal to enhance GO Transit rail service with the city of Toronto. However, he did say that he would proceed with the LRT, although the project would not be a priority for him.

On April 27, 2015, Steven Del Duca, the Ontario Minister of Transportation, said that the LRT project would not start until at least 2021. In July 2016, Toronto City Council approved a one-stop subway extension on Line 2 Bloor–Danforth to Scarborough Centre Station. During this vote, city council also approved putting an extension of Line 4 into Scarborough back into consideration.

Doug Ford's decision
In April 2019, Doug Ford, who had since become premier of Ontario after the 2018 provincial election, unveiled a plan for new subways in Toronto, including the new Ontario Line to replace the proposed Relief Line, an extension of Line 1 to Richmond Hill, a northeastward extension of Line 2 with new stations to replace Line 3 Scarborough, a westward extension of Line 5 Eglinton to Toronto Pearson International Airport in Mississauga and an extension of Line 4 Sheppard east to McCowan Road, where it would intersect with the Line 2 extension. However, money was not set aside in the government's budget for the Line 4 extension.

During the 2022 provincial election, Doug Ford campaigned for the eastward extension of Line 4 to Scarborough to intersect with the Line 2 extension, as well as for other subway extensions in Toronto. Following Ford's re-election as premier of Ontario, the Ontario Fall Economic Statement in 2022 recommitted the government to the eastward extension by confirming planning work had continued for the Sheppard Subway Extension, which would extend Line 4 from its existing terminus at Don Mills station to McCowan Road.

Service frequency 

The frequency for this line is 5 to 6 minutes at all times during scheduled hours.

On September 4, 2005, an overnight service on Sheppard Avenue East was introduced. The 385 Sheppard East Blue Night bus route provides late-night service when the subway is not in operation with the frequency of 30 minutes. This service terminates at Sheppard–Yonge station and follows Sheppard Avenue East to Meadowvale Road.

See also
MoveOntario 2020
List of transport megaprojects

References

External links 

 
 Transit Toronto – The Sheppard subway
 Rapid Transit Expansion Study (Toronto Transit Commission, 2001). (PDF, 2.6 MB)

4
Railway lines opened in 2002
4 ft 10⅞ in gauge railways
2002 establishments in Ontario
Rapid transit lines in Canada